Allocasuarina portuensis, commonly known as the Nielsen Park she-oak, is an extremely rare plant growing in Sydney, Australia. It is dioecious, that is, male and female flowers are borne on separate plants.

The plant was discovered by Peter Brookhouse, a NPWS Ranger who worked at Sydney Harbour National Park. It was officially described by Lawrie Johnson in 1989. The specific epithet portuensis is from the Latin, meaning "inhabiting a port", as this species was originally found at Port Jackson. It most resembles Allocasuarina rigida and A. distyla and can be distinguished by differences in the male flowers. A. portuensis was originally identified in 1986 from ten specimens at Nielsen Park, in the city's eastern suburbs. Those original plants have now died. However, efforts to propagate and reintroduce the species began from the time it was identified, and plants were planted at several locations around Nielsen Park and nearby Gap Bluff and Hermit Point. 54 of these remained alive in 2000.

The original habitat was forest over sandstone-based soils, with canopy trees such as Port Jackson fig (Ficus rubiginosa), smooth-barked apple (Angophora costata), blueberry ash (Elaeocarpus reticulatus) and cheese tree (Glochidion ferdinandi). The understory consists of Pittosporum revolutum, Kunzea ambigua and Monotoca elliptica. The original range is unknown, as so much of the nearby bush has been cleared.

References

External links
  Occurrence data for Allocasuarina portuensis from The Australasian Virtual Herbarium

portuensis
Flora of New South Wales
Trees of Australia
Fagales of Australia
Plants described in 1989
Endemic flora of Australia
Dioecious plants